Zabukovje is a dispersed settlement below Sveti Jošt in the City Municipality of Kranj in the Upper Carniola region of Slovenia.

References

External links

Zabukovje on Geopedia

Populated places in the City Municipality of Kranj